In Sufism, the Majzoob or Majzub (plural: مَجَاذِيبٌ majazib, majazeeb) is a mystical station (ḥāl) that the Muslim saint (wali) underwent in his journey within Islamic sufism to reach the posture (maqām) of reacher (wasil) and perfect man (al-Insān al-Kāmil).

Presentation
Majzoobs are such murids whose hearts (qulub) are soaked, immersed and illuminated with anwar and asrar even before they engage in adhkar and awrad.

They do not first engage in dhikr until God illumines their hearts and guides them from the very inception.

After being illumined with divine lights, they engage in recitation and invocation which is not a hard task for them because in their state it is just as breathing is.

Duncan Forbes said:

John Thompson Platts said:

Ra Gohar Shahi said:

Muḥammad Fasī al-Dīn said:

Since the Majzoob is a wasil who has approached and reached the pinnacle of Sufism, the Sufis ascribe all sorts of Karamat and powers to them, from helping others miraculously to knowing matters of Al-Ghaib

Difference with Salik 
The wali who is characterized by attraction and soaking, is distinguished, from other salikin saints who are characterized by behavior, in that he receives from God selection and care without much religious practice (ibadah) of remembrance (dhikr) and rituals (awrad), thus reaching the station (maqām) of the linker (wasil).

Syed Yusuf Shahab said in his book The Lost Sufis of Delhi:

Legality
The Islamic legality of majzoob's position is stated in the Holy Quran in several verses:

 Verse 58 of Surah Maryam shows that seeking refuge (Arabic: اجْتِبَاءٌ) and guidance (hidayah) is one of the favors of God Almighty over some of His chosen and selected servants, and among them are those who are attracted (majazeeb):

 Verse 13 of Surah Ash-Shura shows that seeking refuge (Arabic: اجْتِبَاءٌ) is a favor (Arabic: نِعْمَةٌ) of God Almighty, and guidance (hidayah) is offered to the assiduous and humble practitioner:

Practice 
When the chosen majzoob receives the divine flow of the ma'rifa, the irfan and the haqiqa, he finds himself in a situation of sublimation (Arabic: اصطلام) due to this spiritual ascent (Arabic: التَّرَقِّي) unexpected and sudden, and therefore a whole directive of conduct must taint his subsequent behavior in order to attain the approval and acceptance of his Lord.

He must then look for a sheikh or murshid proven and confirmed in Sufism to accompany him in his return to the worldly life of Muslims through a prolapse (Arabic: التَّدَلِّي) from this position of ecstasy to a form of moderate ritual practice (ibadah) according to sharia and righteousness, and he will then be named salik.

If this attraction is pure generosity (karamat) from the Lord, then the etiquette of the slave requires him to abide by the modesty of this generous gift through his commitment to uprightness in his desires, laws and commands stipulated in the Quran and Sunnah in order to achieve true servitude.

Ibn al-Banna al-Sarqasti composed a poem in which he described the need of the devotees of God, among them the majazeeb, for a guide and a sheikh who guides them to the signs of true worship:

Misconducts 
When the majzoob practices the awrad without moderation and balance, this insanity can cause a permanent physical and mental abuse to the Sufi.

People in this abused state can be seen like crazy and vagabonds near the tombs of the Sufis and in isolated places.

Sometimes, the Sufis glorify the state of these majazeeb claiming that they have not acquired this state but that it is something bestowed.

See also

References

External links
 
 
 
 
 

Sufism
Spiritual practice
Language and mysticism
Arabic words and phrases
Islamic belief and doctrine
Islamic terminology